Simon Verbeek (born 29 March 1967) is a former Australian rules footballer who played with Carlton in the Australian Football League (AFL).

Notes

External links

Simon Verbeek's profile at Blueseum

1967 births
Carlton Football Club players
Oakleigh Football Club players
Australian rules footballers from Victoria (Australia)
Living people